Aundha Nagnath, one of the 12 Jyotirlingas, is a sacred pilgrimage site in Hingoli district. temples mentioned in the Shiva Purana and is one of the twelve Jyotirlingas. It is located in  Hingoli Maharashtra, India.

Jyotirlinga
According to Shiv Mahapuraan, Brahma (The Creator) and Vishnu (The Preserver) once had a disagreement about which of them was supreme. To test them, Shiva pierced the three worlds as an immeasurable pillar of light, the Jyotirlinga. Vishnu and Brahma parted company to determine the extent of each end of the pillar. Brahma, who had set off upward, lied that he had discovered the upper end of the pillar, but Vishnu, who had gone in the direction of the base of the pillar, admitted that he had not. Shiva then appeared as a second Jyotirlinga and cursed Brahma, telling him that he would have no place in the ceremonies. The Jyotirlinga is the supreme indivisible reality from which Shiva appears. Jyothirlinga shrines commemorate this time when Shiva appeared. It was believed that there were originally sixty-four jyotirlingas. Twelve are considered to be especially auspicious and holy. Each of the twelve sites takes the name of the presiding deity and each is considered a separate manifestation of Shiva. At all these sites, the primary deity is a lingam representing the beginning less and endless Stambha pillar, symbolizing the Shiva's infinite nature. The twelve jyothirlinga are Somnath in Gujarat, Mallikarjuna at Srisailam in Andhra Pradesh, Mahakaleswar at Ujjain in Madhya Pradesh, Omkareshwar in Madhya Pradesh, Kedarnath in Himalayas, Bhimashankar in Maharashtra, Viswanath at Varanasi in Uttar Pradesh, Triambakeshwar in Maharashtra, Vaidyanath at Deoghar in Jharkhand, Nageshwar temple near hingoli in Maharashtra, Rameshwar at Rameswaram in Tamil Nadu and Grishneshwar at Aurangabad in Maharashtra.

Nageshwar Jyotirlinga is situated in a forest called Aundha Nagnath In maharashtra
</ref>

Legend
This is called Ashtam Jyotirlinga Sri Nageshwar Jyotirlinga.

The current name of this city is Aundha and earlier its name was Darukavan, this place is located in Aundha taluka of Hingoli district in Maharashtra.

Very Ancient History of the Temple :-

In the establishment of this Jyotirliga, the history of a demon named Daruka is told.

In ancient times there was a demon called Daruka, who performed severe penance to please Parvati.  Parvati was pleased with her penance and gave her a forest.  This forest was very miraculous.  He followed Daruka wherever she went.  In this forest Daruka lived with her husband Daruk.  Both Daruka and Daruk were very proud of their power.  These two were brutally torturing all the people.  Many Brahmins were killed by him.  Some Brahmins were banned.

A Brahmin among the banned Brahmins was a devotee of Shiva.  In prison he started worshiping Lord Shankara.  When the demon Daruk realized this, he threatened to kill the Brahmin Shiva devotee and left.  After some time the Brahmin Shiva devotee started worshiping Shankara again.  As soon as Daruka realized this, he came running.  He broke the worship with a kick.  He started killing Brahmins.  After that all the Brahmins prayed to Shankara.  At that moment Mahadev was pleased with his devotees and killed Daruka and the Daruka demons.  Then Mahadev told the Brahmins that I will live here forever in the form of Nageshwar Jyotirlinga.  The same place is today famous as Nagnath or Nagesh Jyotirlinga.  The forest surrounding the temple is called Darukavan.

Later on, a large Amardak lake was formed at this place.

And Jyotirlinga was included in that lake.

History of Pandava Period :-

Ages passed and came Dwapar Yuga the birth age of Shri Krishna,

When the five Pandavas were defeated by the Kauravas in the dice game, the Pandavas were sentenced to 12 years of exile and one year of exile as per the terms of the dice game.  Meanwhile, the Pandavas traveled all over India.  While wandering they came to this dark forest and there was a cow with them in this place, that cow used to come down to the lake every day and give milk. Once Bhima saw this and the next day he followed the cow down to the lake and saw Lord Mahadev then he realized that the cow was milking the Shivalinga every day.  Then all the five Pandavas decided to destroy that lake.  And Vir Bhima struck the water from all four sides of that lake with his mace and everyone saw Mahadev. Shri Krishna informed them about that Shivalinga and said that it is Nageshwar Jyotirlinga.  Then the five Pandavas built a magnificent unbroken stone temple of Jyotirlinga situated on the ground floor at that place.

History of Yadav period :-

And again over time the present temple was built by the Seuna (Yadava) dynasty in the Hemadpanthi style and is said to be of the 13th century, a seven storied stone building.

History after 1600 AD :-

Later during the reign of Chhatrapati Sambhaji Maharaj, Aurangzeb destroyed the buildings of this temple, this temple was destroyed during Aurangzeb's victory.  The present standing spire of the temple was rebuilt by Ahilyabai Holkar.

And we see it even today.

Famous Legend :-

The temple is also closely associated with the lives of Namdev, Visoba Khechara and Dnyaneshwar, revered saints of the Varkari sect of Hinduism.

Namdev met his guru Visoba Khechara at Aundha Nagnath temple.  He was advised by Dnyaneshwar to go to this temple.  According to the Gnanadev Gatha, Dnyaneshwar and Muktai ask Namdev to go to Aundha Nagnath's temple in search of a suitable guru.  In the temple, Namdev is seen resting with his feet on the Shivlinga symbolizing Visoba Shiva.  Namdev reproached him for insulting Shiva.  Visoba told Namdev to place his feet elsewhere, and where Namdev placed Visoba's feet, a Shivalinga sprang up.  Thus, Visoba through his yogic power filled the entire temple with Shivalinga and taught Namdev about the omnipresence of the Lord.

A famous story is told about Namdev and Aundha Nagnath temple.  Once he was chanting bhajans in front of the temple along with Dnyaneshwar, Visoba Khechara and some other devotees, the temple priests told him that his singing in front of the temple was disturbing his regular pooja and prayers and asked him to leave the temple.  The priest of the temple insulted Bhagat Namdev and told him why he came to the temple because he was of low caste.  Then Bhagat Namdev went to the back side of the temple and started chanting hymns there.  But God moved around the temple to be in the sight of the sad devotee and listen to the bhajans.  The reason why there is a Nandi at the back of the temple is a testimony to that miracle.

Relationship with Sikhism :-

Guru Nanak, the founder of Sikhism, is said to have visited the Aundha Nagnath temple while walking through the area and also visited Narsi Bamni, the birthplace of Namdev.  It has to be mentioned here that Namdev is worshiped as Bhagat Namdev in Sikhism.

The Shiva Purana says Nageshvara Jyotirlinga is in 'the Darukavana', which is an ancient name of a forest in India. 'Darukavana' finds mention in Indian epics, such as Kamyakavana, Dvaitavana, Dandakavana.

A narrative in the Shiva Purana about the Nageshvara Jyotirlinga tells of a demon named  Daruk, who attacked a Shiva devotee named Supriya and imprisoned him along with many others in his city of Darukavana, a city under the sea inhabited by sea snakes and demons. At the urgent exhortations of Supriya, the prisoners started to chant the holy mantra of Shiva and immediately thereafter Lord Shiva appeared and the demon was vanquished, later residing there in the form of a Jyotirlinga. The demon had a wife, a demoness named Daruka who worshipped Mata Parvati. As a result of her penance and devotion, Mata Parvati enabled her to master the forest where she performed her devotions, and renamed the forest 'Darukavana' in her honour. Wherever Daruka went the forest followed her. In order to save the demons of Darukavana from the punishment of the gods,  Daruk summoned up the power Parvati had given her. She then moved the entire forest into the sea where they continued their campaign against the hermits, kidnapping people and keeping them confined in their new lair under the sea, which was how that great Shiva devotee, Supriya, had wound up there.

The arrival of Supriya caused a revolution. He set up a lingam and made the prisoners recite the mantra Om Namaha Shivay in honour of Shiva while he prayed to the lingam. The demons' response to the chanting was to attempt to kill Supriya, though they were thwarted when Shiva appeared and handed him a divine weapon that saved his life. Daruka and the demons were defeated and Parvati saved the remaining demons. The lingam that Supriya had set up was called Nagesha; it is the tenth lingam. Shiva once again assumed the form of a Jyotirlinga with the name Nageshwar, while the Goddess Parvati was known as Nageshwari. Lord Shiva then announced that he would show the correct path to those who would worship him.

Important celebrations

1. Palkhi ceremony is celebrated with great enthusiasm on Dussehra from this temple. Sri's palanquin leaves the temple and crosses the village boundary and passes through the temple of Nagnath's uncle Laundeshwar and then returns to the temple. In the temple at that time Shri is attractively decorated. 

2. In the temple there is a very charming carved Dasavatari idol of Shri Hari Vishnu. When you first visit the temple, it seems that the temple belongs only to Shri Hari Vishnu. After Dussehra, Shram Nidra of Shri Hari starts and it ends on Kojagiri Poornima, Cucumber Aarti starts from Kojagiri Poornima. This Cucumber Aarti is held every morning from 5 AM to 7 AM. The duration of this Aarti is one month. Kirtan, the hymn of God, is sung during Aarti. 

3. A large yatra is held in this temple on the occasion of Mahashivratri. This journey lasts for five days. The day of Mahashivratri is actually considered to be the wedding day of Lord Shankara. Rathotsava is celebrated on the fifth day of the yatra. A procession of the idol of Shri is taken out in a wooden chariot in the temple premises. This wooden chariot is pulled by devotees with great devotion. Lakhs of devotees attend Rathotsavam. The Yatra concludes with Rathotsava. Day by day the nature of the yatra here is changing and now due to lack of sufficient space, it is felt that theaters, various shops, sky watching, circus are less frequent in the yatra. Although the earlier enthusiasm in the Yatra is waning, the number of pilgrims is increasing significantly. As the village of Aundha Nagnath is situated in the lap of hills, the environment here is very scenic and there are large lakes in the town

Description of the temple

Its beauty has been enhanced by carving sculptures of Yakshayakshina etc. on it. Information about some important sculptures in this sculpture is as follows:

1. Shankar Parvati is seated on Mount Kailas and Ravana is trying to move Mount.

2. Dashavatar of Lord Vishnu.

3. The sculpture of Ardhanarinteshwar has half of Shankara and half of Parvati.

4. Nataraja performing Tandava dance.

5. A monstrous form of Veer Bhadra.

6. Covering any one of the three faces and four legs of a person in a sculpture forms a complete act of a person.

7. Apart from this, the temple is graced with a magnificent meditative idol measuring approximately 5.5 feet long and 8 feet wide on all three sides.

The artists of the time have provided facilities to remove the polluted air from the gabhar. Where there are joints in construction. At that place, an attempt has been made to strengthen the construction by using a mixture of iron and lead.

Location controversy

Shiva MahaPurana indicates that the location was on Western (Arabian) Sea. In KotiRudra Samhita, Chapter 29, the following shloka says
 पश्चिमे सागरे तस्य वनं सर्वसमृद्धिमत् । 
योजनानां षोडशभिर्विस्तृतं सर्वतो दिशम् ॥ ४ ॥ 
The actual location of the legendary forest of Darukavana is still debated. No other important clues indicate the location of the Jyotirlinga. 'Darukavana' on the Western Sea remains the only clue.

The name Darukavana, named after Queen Daruka, is possibly derived from daruvana (forest of deodar trees, or simply, forest of wood), is thought to exist in Almora. Deodar (daru vriksha) is found abundantly only in the western Himalayas, not in peninsular India. Deodar trees have been associated with Lord Shiva in ancient Hindu texts. Hindu sages used to reside and perform meditation in deodar forests to please Lord Shiva. Also, according to the ancient treatise Prasadmandanam,
"हिमाद्रेरूत्तरे पार्श्वे देवदारूवनं परम् पावनं शंकरस्थानं तत्र् सर्वे शिवार्चिताः।" Because of this the 'Jageswara' temple in Almora, Uttarakhand is commonly identified as Nageshvara Jyotirlinga.

The written name of Darukavana could be misread as 'Dwarakavana' which would point to the Nageswara temple at Dwaraka. However, no forest is in this part of Dwaraka that finds mention in any of the Indian epics. The narratives of Shri Krishna, mention Somanatha and the adjoining Prabhasa tirtha, but not Nageswara or Darukavana in Dwaraka.

Darukavana might exist next to the Vindhya Mountains. It is south-southwest of the Vindhyas extending to the sea in the west. In the Dvadasha Jyotirlinga Stotra (6), Shankaracharya praised this Jyotirlinga as Naganath:
"Yamye sadange nagaretiramye vibhushitangam vividhaishcha bhogai
Sadbhaktimuktipradamishamekam shrinaganatham sharanam prapadye"
This can be taken to mean that it is in the south ['Yamye'] 'Sadanga' city, which was the ancient name of Aundha Nagnath in Maharashtra and where the actual Nageshwar Jyotirlinga is located, south of Jageshwar temple in Uttarakhand and west of Dwarka Nageshwar..

Connectivity
Nearest Airport: Aurangabad

Nearest Railway Station: Hingoli and Parbhani

Airport :- Aurangabad Airport is the nearest local airport to Aundha Nagnath which is about 210 KM away.  Mumbai's Chhatrapati Shivaji Airport is the nearest international airport which is about 580 km away.  So Aundha Nagnath can be easily reached by air travel 

Railway Station:- Nearest station to Aundha Nagnath is Hingoli Deccan.  It is about 25 km away and is well connected by rail to all cities in Maharashtra and outside Maharashtra.  Another option is Parbhani Junction which is about 51 kilometers away and can be reached by bus or taxi to Aundha. 

Bus & Taxi :- The distance from Aundha to Mumbai is approximately 580 kms.  It is about 200 kilometers from Aurangabad and 360 kilometers from Nagpur.  State transport and private buses ply between these cities and Aundha Nagnath.  Apart from this, buses also run from Hingoli, Parbhani.  Alternatively, you can opt for Hingoli Deccan, which is just half an hour away from Aundha.

See also
 Dwarka
 Dwarkadhish Temple
 Somnath Temple
 Jageshwar
 Aundha Nagnath Temple

References

Sources

External links
 Nageshvara Jyotirlinga, Indian GK
 Nageswar Archeology
 Nageswar Jyotirlinga Temple(Complete info)

Jyotirlingas
Hindu temples in Maharashtra
Shiva temples in Maharashtra
Hingoli district
Hindu pilgrimages
Hindu pilgrimage sites
Hindu pilgrimage sites in India
Religious tourism
Religious tourism in India